Navy blue is a color.

Navy Blue(s) may also refer to:

Film and television 
 Navy Blues (1923 film), an American silent film directed by Harold Beaudine
 Navy Blues (1929 film), an American film directed by Clarence Brown
 Navy Blues (1937 film), an American film directed by Ralph Staub
 Navy Blues (1941 film), an American film directed by Lloyd Bacon
 "Navy Blues" (Law & Order), a television episode

Music 
 Navy Blue (album), by Diane Renay, 1964
 Navy Blues (album), by Sloan, 1998
 "Navy Blue" (Diane Renay song), 1964
 "Navy Blue" (Rina Aiuchi song), 2001
 "Navy Blue", a 2019 single by Charlotte Lawrence
 "Navy Blue", a 2019 song by MUNA from Saves the World
 "Navy Blue", a 2014 song by The Story So Far from Songs Of
 Navy Blue (rapper), Sage Elsesser (born 1997), American skateboarder, rapper, and model

Other
 Navy Blue (pigeon), received the Dickin Medal for bravery in World War II